The WSU Spirit Championship is a women's professional wrestling championship in Women Superstars United (WSU). It is competed for in Women Superstars United, and has been defended on shows of sister promotion National Wrestling Superstars.

Title history

Combined reigns

See also
Women Superstars United
WSU Championship
WSU Tag Team Championship

References

External links
	WSU Spirit Championship

Women's professional wrestling championships
Women Superstars Uncensored